Brigadier is a military rank in many countries.

Brigadier or The Brigadier may also refer to:
 
 Brigadier General, a military rank
 Brigadier Lethbridge-Stewart, a fictional character in the television series Doctor Who
 GMC Brigadier, a series of heavy-duty trucks
 ST Brigadier, originally Empire Frank, a tug in service with Steel & Bennie Ltd, 1946-1960
 The Brigadier (newspaper), a student newspaper at The Citadel, Charleston, South Carolina, US
 The Brigadier (painting), a 2004 portrait of Andrew Parker Bowles by Lucian Freud

See also
 Brigade (disambiguation)